Daydream is the second album by the Lovin' Spoonful, released in 1966. It features two hits, "Daydream", which reached No. 2 in the U.S. Billboard Top 40 charts, and "You Didn't Have to Be So Nice" (U.S. No. 10).

History
With only five originals on the band's debut release, Do You Believe in Magic,  Daydream featured much more songwriting by Lovin' Spoonful co-founder singer and vocalist John Sebastian, who either wrote or co-wrote all but one of the songs on this release.

Daydream was re-released on CD in 2002 by Buddah Records and included five bonus tracks.

Covers
The song "Daydream" was recorded by Bobby Darin for his album If I Were A Carpenter. British pop group Right Said Fred took the song "Daydream" to Number 29 on the UK Singles Chart in 1992. The New Jersey band Yo La Tengo released its arrangement of "Butchie's Tune" on their 2015 album Stuff Like That There.  In 1967 Scott McKenzie recorded "It's Not Time Now" for his debut album The Voice of Scott McKenzie.

Reception

Writing for AllMusic, Gary Mollica describes the album as "very strong".
It was voted number 767 in the third edition of Colin Larkin's All Time Top 1000 Albums (2000). The album reached number 9 on the Finnish Album Chart in August 1966.

Track listing
All tracks are written by John Sebastian except as noted.

Side one
"Daydream"2:21
"There She Is"1:58
"It's Not Time Now" (Sebastian, Zal Yanovsky)2:49
"Warm Baby"2:03
"Day Blues" (Joe Butler, Sebastian)3:15
"Let the Boy Rock and Roll" (Butler, Sebastian)2:34

Side two
"Jug Band Music"2:53
"Didn't Want to Have to Do It"2:36
"You Didn't Have to Be So Nice" (Steve Boone, Sebastian)2:29
"Bald Headed Lena" (Willy Perryman, Edward Snead)2:25
"Butchie's Tune" (Boone, Sebastian)2:37
"Big Noise from Speonk" (Boone, Butler, Sebastian, Yanovsky)2:21

Personnel
John Sebastian – vocals, electric and acoustic guitars, autoharp, harmonica, keyboards
Steve Boone – bass, vocals
Joe Butler – drums, percussion, vocals
Zal Yanovsky – electric and acoustic guitars, vocals

References

The Lovin' Spoonful albums
1966 albums
Kama Sutra Records albums
Albums produced by Erik Jacobsen